There are several valleys called Mosedale and watercourses called Mosedale Beck in Cumbria, England.

There is also a hamlet called Mosedale, in the parish of Mungrisdale.

References

Landforms of Cumbria